Segodnya was a Russian-language Ukrainian tabloid newspaper founded in 1997.  While run from Kyiv, it was linked to Donbas political and business groups; its holding company is owned by Rinat Akhmetov's Ukraina Media Group. 
The paper supported former Prime Minister Viktor Yanukovych for the presidency in 2004.  Since the "Orange Revolution", the newspaper has moderated its pro-Eastern reporting under pressure from its own journalists.  

Segodnya was a member of the Ukrainian Association of Press Publishers.

In July 2022 Rinat Akhmetov folded all his media business due to entering into force of the anti-oligarch law.

Censorship
In 2011, the paper's journalists threatened to go on strike after Chief Editor Ihor Guzhva was controversially fired, and his replacement censored certain types of stories, and dictated to journalists how certain politicians and public figures should be covered. "Olena Hromnytska is trying to implement corruption schemes for publishing paid articles ... and also to introduce censorship in the newspaper" the journalists' statement read. In particular, the statement said she ordered some stories removed from the website about Odesa Mayor Oleksiy Kostusev and presidential adviser Hanna Herman. She also mandated favorable coverage of certain politicians and public figures, the journalists say. The newspaper was even accused of publishing forged documents.

References

External links

 

Newspapers established in 1997
Russian-language newspapers published in Ukraine
Mass media in Kyiv
Mass media of the Euromaidan
2022 disestablishments in Ukraine
Publications disestablished in 2022
Defunct newspapers published in Ukraine